
Year 253 BC was a year of the pre-Julian Roman calendar. At the time it was known as the Year of the Consulship of Caepio and Blaesus (or, less frequently, year 501 Ab urbe condita). The denomination 253 BC for this year has been used since the early medieval period, when the Anno Domini calendar era became the prevalent method in Europe for naming years.

Events 
 By place 
 Seleucid Empire 
 The second Syrian War between the Seleucids and the Ptolemies ends. Antiochus II regains much of Anatolia from Ptolemy II, including the cities of Miletus and Ephesus, and also the Phoenician coast.
 The war is concluded with the marriage of Antiochus to Ptolemy II's daughter, Berenice Syra. Antiochus divorces his previous wife, Laodice, and transfers the succession to Berenice's children.
 In recapturing the city of Miletus, Antiochus II overthrows the tyrant of the city. In response, the citizens worship him as a god in thanksgiving leading to the addition of Theos to Antiochus II's name.

 Roman Republic 
 A second Roman war fleet of 150 ships is wrecked on the voyage from Lilybaeum (in Sicily) to Rome.
 Tiberius Coruncanius is the first plebeian to be elected pontifex maximus of Rome.

 Greece 
 Alexander, Antigonus II's nephew and regent, leads a revolt in Corinth with Ptolemy II's help and declares himself an independent monarch. As a result, Antigonus loses Corinth and Chalcis, the two bases from which he has dominated southern Greece. As the Aetolians occupy Thermopylae, Antigonus II is cut off from Athens and the Peloponnese.
 Macedonia's involvement in the second Syrian War ceases when Antigonus becomes preoccupied with the rebellion of Corinth and Chalcis, as well as an increase in enemy activity along Macedon's northern frontier.

Births 
 Zhang Cang, Chinese general and prime-minister (d. 152 BC)

Deaths

References